Gelechia stenacma is a moth of the family Gelechiidae. It is found in central India.

References

Moths described in 1935
Gelechia